Kripa is a character in Sanskrit epics of ancient India. Kripa may also refer to
Kripa (given name)
Kripa (philosophy), concept of divine grace in Hinduism
Qutub-E-Kripa, en ensemble of Indian musicians
Kripa Sadan High School in Latur, Maharashtra, India